Lorenzo Calonga Arce (28 August 1929 – 20 September 2003) was a Paraguayan football striker and midfielder who was part of the Paraguay squad for the 1950 FIFA World Cup finals.

Career
Calonga began playing football in Paraguay with Cerro Porteño, Club Olimpia and Club Guaraní, where he won the 1949 Paraguayan Primera División title. He moved to Colombia where he played for Deportivo Pereira and Independiente Medellín. He finished his playing career in Mexico with Club León and Club Irapuato.

Calonga scored a goal for the Paraguay national team in a friendly against Brazil on 13 May 1950.

After he retired from playing, Calonga returned to Colombia to work as a coach. He managed Deportes Quindío during the 1961 season.

Personal
Lorenzo Calonga is from a Paraguayan family of famous athletes, including Manuel Calonga who played football and basketball for Club Guaraní.

Calonga died from pneumonia in Arauca, at the age of 77.

References

External links
FIFA profile

1926 births
2003 deaths
Paraguayan footballers
Paraguay international footballers
1950 FIFA World Cup players
Association football forwards
Club Guaraní players
Deportivo Pereira footballers
Independiente Medellín footballers
Club León footballers
Irapuato F.C. footballers